Elaphrus ullrichii is a species of ground beetle in the subfamily Elaphrinae. It was described by W. Redtenbacher in 1842.

References

Elaphrinae
Beetles described in 1842